Esteban Moctezuma Barragán (born 21 October 1954 in Mexico City) is a Mexican diplomat and politician, formerly affiliated with the Institutional Revolutionary Party (PRI) and is currently a member of MORENA. He is a former Senator and served as Secretary of Social Development and Secretary of the interior in the cabinet of President Ernesto Zedillo Ponce de León. From that position, early in January 1995, he pursued peace talks in Chiapas with the EZLN insurgents; in February the government pursued a strategy of military intervention, followed by a resumption of peace talks with the insurgents. In 2018, he was appointed by President Andrés Manuel López Obrador as Secretary of Education. On 16 December 2020, Moctezuma was nominated Ambassador of Mexico to the United States and confirmed by the Senate on 16 January 2021.

1995 Zapatista Crisis  

With President Carlos Salinas de Gortari economic and political reforms and the North American Free Trade Agreement, Mexico was being propelled into the world economy as an important player. The Zapatistas uprising occurred at a time when the unsolved ethnic situation was brewing in the Mexican county. The Mexican Government started immediate peace talks. In the early days of the new government administration, President Zedillo took a series of erratic decisions that completely broke with the previous administration agreements and with his own previously defined action plan.

On January 5 of 1995 the Secretary of Interior Esteban Moctezuma began a series of secret meetings with Subcomandante Marcos, called "Steps Toward Peace," that took place in the village of Guadalupe Tepeyac, belonging to the municipality of Pantelho, Chiapas. Important specific agreements were reached to which both parties agreed: that the Mexican army withdraw from certain points, such as San Andres Larrainzar, and that Marcos make a concession that a group of citizens be involved in a formal negotiation to start a couple of weeks later. Because of the fast progress of the negotiations in the "Steps Toward Peace", and with the possibility of an agreement looking very close, Marcos wrote: “I am being threatened with unemployment,“

Secretary of Public Education
Esteban Moctezuma became Secretary of Public Education (SEP) under President Andrés Manuel López Obrador (AMLO) in 2018. As Secretary, he supported the reversal of the controversial Educational Reform instituted by President Enrique Peña Nieto in 2013, instituted a "neutral uniform" that allows girls to wear pants to school, and sponsored the publication of a free geography textbook. During the 2020 COVID-19 pandemic in Mexico, Moctezuma oversaw the institution of distance learning.

In an October 2020 appearance before the Senate of the Republic, Moctezuma Barragán said that a SEP survey had increased confidence in public education from 5.8 on a scale of 0–10 in January 2019 to  7.7 in August 2020. He testified that the distance learning program Aprende en casa I had achieved its goals, in that pupil exam results for high school were as good in 2020 as in previous years, despite three months of home education. He pointed out that distance learning involved a combination of online classes and televised classes, in that 94% of Mexican households have a television. Broadcasts are made in Spanish and twenty-two indigenous languages, and the SEP distributed 700,000 notebooks and other school supplies. The SEP provided training for online classes for 1,200,000 teachers and parents and provided email accounts to 19,500,000 students. Televised classes of Aprende en casa II for the 2020–2021 school year reach 30.4 million users with another 1.2 million pupils who have classes via radio.

Moctezuma also announced that 140 campuses of Universidades para el Bienestar (Universities for Well-Being) offer 36 different majors and serve 32,000 students.

Personal life
Esteban Moctezuma is the son of architect Pedro Moctezuma Diaz Infante and  María Teresa Barragán Álvarez. He is married to Cecilia Barbara Morfín. Esteban Moctezuma received a bachelor's degree in economics from the National Autonomous University of Mexico and a master's degree in economic policy from Cambridge University (United Kingdom).

Esteban Moctezuma joined TV Azteca in 2002 and currently serves as chief executive officer of :es:Fundación Azteca of the Grupo Salinas. and is a columnist for El Universal and El Economista.

He is a direct descendant of Moctezuma II, 9th Tlatoani of Tenochtitlan, 6th Emperor of the Mexica, 9th Emperor of the Aztec Empire.

Sources

Diccionario biográfico del gobierno mexicano, Ed. Fondo de Cultura Económica, Mexico, 1992.

External links
Interview at Canal 100 
Management team of Grupo Salinas

1954 births
Living people
Grupo Salinas
Moctezuma family
Members of the Senate of the Republic (Mexico)
Institutional Revolutionary Party politicians
Mexican Secretaries of the Interior
National Autonomous University of Mexico alumni
People from Mexico City
Alumni of the University of Cambridge
Mexican Secretaries of Education
Morena (political party) politicians
Mexican people of Aztec descent
Cabinet of Andrés Manuel López Obrador
Ambassadors of Mexico to the United States
20th-century Mexican politicians
21st-century Mexican politicians